Mark Mitten is an Academy Award nominated and Emmy Award winning film producer. He is best known for Abacus: Small Enough to Jail nominated for the Academy Award for Best Documentary Feature.

Filmography
 2004-2005: The Apprentice (TV Series) (task producer - 33 episodes)
 2010: Making Big Plans: The Story of Chicago's Olympic Dream (TV Movie documentary) (producer) 
 2012: The Most American City (Video short) (producer) 
 2014: Life Itself (Documentary) (executive producer) 
 2016: Abacus: Small Enough to Jail (Documentary) (producer) 
 2017: Frontline (TV Series documentary) (producer - 1 episode) 
 2019: Ringside (Documentary) ( executive producer)
 2019: White Eye (Feature short) (executive producer)
 2020: Finding Yingying (Documentary) (executive producer)
2021: Miracle on 19th Street (Documentary Short) (director/producer)
202i: The Lost Leonardo (Documentary) (executive producer)

References

Externals

American film producers
Year of birth missing (living people)
Living people